Laura Spencer (born May 8, 1986) is an American actress. She is known for playing Jane Bennet in the 2012 web series The Lizzie Bennet Diaries which is an adaptation of Pride and Prejudice, intern Jessica Warren in seasons 9 to 12 of Bones, and Emily Sweeney in seasons 7 to 10 of the CBS comedy series The Big Bang Theory. She recently had a guest role on fellow Oklahoman Sterlin Harjo's FX on Hulu's TV series Reservation Dogs.

Early life
Spencer was born on May 8, 1986, in Oklahoma City, Oklahoma, and grew up in Edmond where she attended Santa Fe High School, graduating in 2004. She went on to the University of Oklahoma, and earned a Bachelor of Fine Arts degree in 2008.

Career
Spencer played Jane Bennet in the web series The Lizzie Bennet Diaries. She had a main role as Emily Sweeney, Raj Koothrappali's girlfriend on The Big Bang Theory, which began in that show's seventh season, in the March 6, 2014, episode "The Friendship Turbulence". That same year, she had begun a formerly recurring role as Jessica Warren on Bones.

Filmography

Film

Television

Web series

References

External links
 
 
 

Living people
21st-century American actresses
American television actresses
American film actresses
1986 births
Actresses from Oklahoma City